The Andrei Borisovich Vistelius Research Award is given to a young scientist for promising contributions in research in the application of mathematics or informatics in any field of the earth sciences by the International Association for Mathematical Geosciences (IAMG). A recipient must be 35 years or younger at the end of the calendar year for which he or she has been selected for the award. This award is named after Andrei Borisovich Vistelius, and was established in 1981.

Recipients
Source: IAMG

1981	John M. Cubitt
1982	Stephen Henley and William E. Full
1983	Brian Jones
1984	Michel Rabinowicz
1985	Georges Verly
1986	Marek Kacewicz
1987	James R. Carr
1988	Andrew R. Solow
1989	Olivier Dubrule
1990	Guocheng Pan
1991	George Christakos
1992	Ute C. Herzfeld
1993	R. Mohan Srivastava
1994	Clayton V. Deutsch
1995	Qiuming Cheng
1997	Gerardus J. Weltje
1999	Pierre Goovaerts
2001	Jef Caers
2003	Karl Gerald van den Boogaart
2005	Sebastien Strebelle
2007	Raimon Tolosana-Delgado
2009	Guillaume Caumon
2011	Olena Babak 
2013	Gregoire Mariethoz
2015   Xiaogang (Marshall) Ma
2017   Pejman Tahmasebi
2019 	Alessandra Menafoglio ; Wenlei Wang
2021   Vanessa Godoy ; Francky Fouedjio

See also

 List of geology awards
 List of geophysics awards
 List of mathematics awards

References 

Awards of the International Association for Mathematical Geosciences
Awards established in 1981